Polyhedrosis is a viral disease in which polyhedral 'occlusion bodies' are formed, which carry the virus.

Polyhedrosis may refer to:

 Cytoplasmic polyhedrosis virus
 Nuclear polyhedrosis virus